Giriraj Kabra is an Indian film and television actor. After completing an acting course from the Roshan Taneja School of Acting in Mumbai, he made his debut as Balwinder Singh in the film Kirkit.  As a television actor, his debut was in Mata Ki Chowki as Madhav. Shortly after his debut, he was cast in the lead role of Bittu in  Hi! Padosi... Kaun Hai Doshi?  When this show’s name was changed to  Piya Ka Ghar Pyaara Lage , Giriraj remained on the show until 2013, when he was suddenly replaced by Raj Singh Suryavanshi ; the show was terminated shortly after Giriraj’s exit.

Giriraj has also appeared on the show  Meri Aashiqui Tum Se Hi  as Rishi Vyas, Kismat Connection as Rahul,  Yeh Kahan Aa Gaye Hum as Harsh Chatterjee,  Kundali Bhagya  as Rajat Bedi,  Daayan  as Kaalnemi,  Laal Ishq  as Mangat,  and Yeshu as Devdoot.

As a model, Giriraj, has walked the ramp at the New York Fashion Week.

Filmography

Film

Television

References

External links 
 

21st-century Indian male actors
Indian male models
Indian male film actors
Living people
Male actors in Hindi cinema
Male actors in Hindi television
Year of birth missing (living people)